Maria of Brunswick-Wolfenbüttel (born: 13 January 1566 in Schladen; died: 13 August 1626 in Lauenburg) was a princess of Brunswick-Wolfenbüttel by birth and by marriage Duchess of Saxe-Lauenburg.

Life 
Mary was a daughter of the Duke Julius of Brunswick-Wolfenbüttel (1528–1589) from his marriage to Hedwig (1540–1602), daughter of the Elector Joachim II of Brandenburg.

She married on 10 November 1582  at Wolfenbüttel with Duke Francis II of Saxe-Lauenburg (1547–1619).  She was his second wife.  She was given Franzhagen Castle as her wittum; she created a Meierhof and a court church there.

Maria died in 1626 and was buried alongside her husband in the ducal family crypt in the Mary Magdalene Church in Lauenburg.

Issue 
 Maria and Francis had 14 children, of whom the following 12 reached adulthood: 
 Francis Julius of Saxony, Angria and Westphalia (13 September 1584 – 8 October 1634, Vienna), ∞ on 14 May 1620 Agnes of Württemberg (Stuttgart, 7 May 1592 – 25 November 1629, ibidem), daughter of Duke Frederick I
 Julius Henry of Saxony, Angria and Westphalia (Lauenburg) (Wolfenbüttel, 9 April 1586 – 20 November 1665, Prague), duke of Saxe-Lauenburg between 1656 and 1665
 Ernest Louis of Saxony, Angria and Westphalia (7 June 1587 – 15 July 1620, Aschau)
 Hedwig Sibylla of Saxony, Angria and Westphalia (15 October 1588 – 4 June 1635)
 Juliana of Saxony, Angria and Westphalia (26 December 1589 – 1 December 1630, Norburg), ∞ on 1 August 1627 Friedrich of Schleswig-Holstein-Nordborg (26 October 1581 – 22 July 1658), son of John II, Duke of Schleswig-Holstein-Sonderburg
 Joachim Sigismund of Saxony, Angria and Westphalia (31 May 1593 – 10 April 1629)
 Francis Charles of Saxony, Angria and Westphalia (2 May 1594 – 30 November 1660, Neuhaus), ∞ in Barth on 19 September 1628 (1) Agnes of Brandenburg (Berlin, 27 July 1584 – 16 March 1629, Neuhaus), daughter of  Elector John George; ∞ in Ödenburg on 27 August 1639 (2) Catherine of Brandenburg (Königsberg, 28 May 1602 – 9 February 1649, Schöningen), daughter of Elector John Sigismund
 Rudolph Maximilian of Saxony, Angria and Westphalia (18 June 1596 – 1 October 1647, Lübeck); ∞ Anna Caterina de Dulcina
 Hedwig Maria of Saxony, Angria and Westphalia (7 August 1597 – 29 August 1644), ∞ in 1636 Prince Annibale Gonzaga of Bozzolo (1602 – 2 August 1668)
 Francis Albert of Saxony, Angria and Westphalia (31 October 1598 – 10 June 1642, Schweidnitz); ∞ on 21 February 1640 in Güstrow Christina Margaret of Mecklenburg-Güstrow (Güstrow, 31 March 1615 – 6 August 1666, Wolfenbüttel), daughter of John Albert II, Duke of Mecklenburg
 Sophia Hedwig of Saxony, Angria and Westphalia (Lauenburg upon Elbe, 24 May 1601 – 21 February 1660, Glücksburg); ∞ on 23 May 1624 in Neuhaus Philip, Duke of Schleswig-Holstein-Sonderburg-Glücksburg (15 March 1584 – 27 September 1663), son of John II, Duke of Schleswig-Holstein-Sonderburg
 Francis Henry of Saxony, Angria and Westphalia (9 April 1604 – 26 November 1658), ∞ on 13 December 1637 in Treptow an der Rega Countess Maria Juliana of Nassau-Siegen (Siegen, 14 August 1612 – 21 January 1665, Franzhagen Castle near Schulendorf), daughter of John VII, Count of Nassau-Siegen

Footnotes

References 
 Johann Samuel Ersch: Allgemeine encyclopädie der wissenschaften und künste, Part 1, vol. 28, J. f. Gleditsch, 1848, p. 69

Middle House of Brunswick
1566 births
1626 deaths
Duchesses of Brunswick-Wolfenbüttel
Duchesses of Saxe-Lauenburg
Daughters of monarchs